Illegal immigration is the migration of people into a country in violation of the immigration laws of that country or the continued residence without the legal right to live in that country. Illegal immigration tends to be financially upward, from poorer to richer countries. Illegal residence in another country creates the risk of detention, deportation, and/or other sanctions.

Asylum seekers who are denied asylum may face impediment to expulsion if the home country refuses to receive the person or if new asylum evidence emerges after the decision. In some cases, these people are considered illegal aliens, and in others, they may receive a temporary residence permit, for example with reference to the principle of non-refoulement in the international Refugee Convention. The European Court of Human Rights, referring to the European Convention on Human Rights, has shown in a number of indicative judgments that there are enforcement barriers to expulsion to certain countries, for example, due to the risk of torture.

Terminology 

The terminology surrounding illegal immigration is often controversial. In particular, describing people who immigrated illegally as illegal immigrants has been a matter of debate. It is nevertheless commonly used in formal contexts, among others by the United States and by the Canadian governments. Title 8 of the US Code is the portion of United States law that contains legislation on citizenship, nationality, and immigration. Defining the legal term alien as "any person not a citizen or national of the United States," the terminology used in Title 8 includes illegal alien (33 times), unauthorized alien (21 times), undocumented alien (18 times), illegal immigrant (6 times), undocumented person (2 times), and others. An analysis by PolitiFact, however, concluded that the term illegal alien "occurs scarcely, often undefined or part of an introductory title or limited to apply to certain individuals convicted of felonies."

There are campaigns that discourage the use of the term illegal immigrant, generally based on the argument that the act of immigrating illegally does not make the people themselves illegal, but rather they are "people who have immigrated illegally." In Europe, the Platform for International Cooperation on Undocumented Migrants (PICUM) launched its international "Words Matter" campaign in 2014 to promote the use of the terms undocumented or irregular migrants instead of illegal. Depending on jurisdiction, culture, or context, alternatives to illegal alien or illegal immigrant can include irregular migrant, undocumented immigrant, undocumented person, and unauthorized immigrant.

In some contexts the term illegal immigrants is shortened, often pejoratively, to illegals.

Irregular migration is a related term that is sometimes used, e.g., by the International Organization for Migration; however, because of the word migration, this term describes a somewhat wider concept which also includes illegal emigration.

News media 
Some news associations have discontinued or discourage the term illegal immigrant, except in quotations. These organizations presently include the Associated Press (US), Press Association (UK), European Journalism Observatory, European Journalism Centre, Association of European Journalists, Australian Press Council, and Media, Entertainment and Arts Alliance (AU). Related terms that describe actions are not similarly discouraged. Most commonly they use the alternative term undocumented immigrant. For example, the Associated Press continues to use the term illegal immigration, whereby illegal describes the action rather than the person.

On the other hand, The New York Times said described undocumented immigrant as a "term preferred by many immigrants and their advocates, but it has a flavor of euphemism and should be used with caution outside quotation." Newsweek questions the use of the phrase undocumented immigrants as a method of euphemistic framing, namely, "a psychological technique that can influence the perception of social phenomena." Newsweek also suggests that persons who enter a country unlawfully cannot be entirely "undocumented," as they "just lack the certain specific documents for legal residency and employment," while "[m]any have driver's licences, debit cards, library cards, and school identifications which are useful documents in specific contexts but not nearly so much for immigration." For example, in the US, youths brought into the country illegally are granted access to public K-12 education and benefits regardless of citizenship status; therefore the youths are not entirely undocumented, since they are in fact documented for educational purposes.

U.S. Government 
In the United States, while overstaying a visa is a civil violation handled by immigration court, entering (including re-entering) the US without approval from an immigration officer is a crime; specifically a misdemeanor on the first offense. Illegal reentry after deportation is a felony offense. This is the distinction between the larger group referred to as unauthorized immigrants and the smaller subgroup referred to as criminal immigrants.

Democratic Senator and Senate Majority Leader Chuck Schumer has spoken out against the term "undocumented", stating that "Illegal immigration is wrong – plain and simple" and that proponents of the term were "not serious" about combatting illegal immigration.

Canadian Government 

In Canada, as in the US, "illegal immigrant" is a commonly used term. However, there is confusion and deep dissent among many about what the term means under the law and under what circumstances, and what it implies socially. "Irregular" is a term used by government authorities to refer to migrants who enter Canada outside of official border crossings ("points of entry"). Entrance into Canada outside of a POE is considered unlawful, but not a criminal offence, or a civil offence under the Immigration and Refugee Protection Act, SC 2001, c 27. Regulations under IRPA require that a person seeking to enter Canada outside a POE should "appear without delay" at the nearest entry point. Section 33 of the IRPA requires that any legal charges against a migrant be stayed while an entrant's asylum claim is being processed.

The Government of Canada and the Immigration and Refugee Board use the term "irregular" to refer to these crossings. The Liberal Party of Canada and the New Democratic Party typically use the term "irregular", while the Conservative Party of Canada typically uses the term "illegal". The use of the term "undocumented" is increasingly prevalent among individual MPs and MPPs in Canada, and was also used in a NDP policy document as well as by Ontario NDP leader Andrea Horwath in a 2018 platform document. Conservative MP Dave Epp referred to "undocumented workers" in a 2020 interview with the CBC wherein he called for an end to the use of contract migrant labour by Canadian agriculture business, in part because many such workers are undocumented and therefore vulnerable to exploitation and unsafe working conditions.

Effects of illegal immigration

Economy and labor market

Research on the economic effects of illegal immigration is scant but existing studies suggest that the effects can be positive for the native population, and for public coffers. One 2015 study shows that "increasing deportation rates and tightening border control weakens low-skilled labor markets, increasing unemployment of native low-skilled workers. Legalization, instead, decreases the unemployment rate of low-skilled natives and increases income per native." This is because the presence of illegal immigrants reduces the labor costs of employers, providing them more opportunities to create more jobs.

A 2013 study by Center for American Progress found that granting citizenship to people who immigrated illegally would boost the U.S. economy: doing so would raise the incomes of the illegal immigrants by a quarter (increasing U.S. GDP by approximately $1.4 trillion over a 10-year period); a 2016 study found that "legalization would increase the economic contribution of the unauthorized population by about 20%, to 3.6% of private-sector GDP;" and a 2019 working paper by the University of Cyprus found that "all types of immigrants generate larger surplus to US firms than natives do".

According to economist George Borjas, immigrants may have caused the decline of real wages of US workers without a high school degree by 9% between 1980 and 2000 due to increased competition. Other economists, such as Gordon Hanson, criticized these findings. Douglas Massey argues that developed countries need unskilled immigrant labor to fill undesirable jobs, which citizens do not seek regardless of wages. Massey argues that this may refute claims that undocumented immigrants are "lowering wages" or stealing jobs from native-born workers, and that it instead shows that undocumented immigrants "take jobs that no one else wants."

A paper by Spanish economists found that, upon granting work permits to the undocumented immigrant population in Spain, the fiscal revenues increased by around €4,189 per newly legalized immigrant. The paper found that the wages of the immigrants increased after receiving work permits. At the same time, some low-skilled natives had worse labor market outcomes and high-skilled natives had improved labor market outcomes.

Since the decline of working class blue-collar jobs in manufacturing and industry, younger native-born generations have acquired higher education. In the US, only 12% of the labor force has less than a high school education, but 70% of illegal workers from Mexico lack a high school degree. The majority of new blue-collar jobs qualify as Massey's "underclass" work, and suffer from unreliability, subservient roles and, critically, a lack of potential for advancement. These "underclass" jobs, which have a disproportionate number of undocumented immigrants, include harvesting crops, unskilled labor in landscaping and construction, house-cleaning, and maid and busboy work in hotels and restaurants. However, as even these "underclass" jobs have higher relative wages than those in home countries they are still attractive for undocumented immigrants and since many undocumented immigrants often anticipate working only temporarily in the destination country, the lack of opportunity for advancement is seen by many as less of a problem. Support for this claim can be seen in a Pew Hispanic Center poll of over 3,000 undocumented immigrants from Mexico in the US, which found that 79% would voluntarily join a temporary worker program that allowed them to work legally for several years but then required them to leave. From this, it is assumed that the willingness to take undesirable jobs is what gives undocumented immigrants their employment. Evidence for this may be seen in the average wages of illegal day laborers in California, which was between $10 and $12 per hour according to a 2005 study, and the fact that this was higher than many entry-level white collar or service jobs. Entry-level white collar and service jobs offer advancement opportunities only for people with work permits and citizenship.

Research indicates that the advantage to firms employing undocumented immigrants increases as more firms in the industry do so, further increases with the breadth of a firm's market, and also with the labor intensity of the firm's production process. However, the advantage decreases with the skill level of the firm's workers, meaning that illegal immigrants do not provide as much competitive advantage when a high-skilled workforce is required.

Reasons for illegal immigration

Poverty
Illegal immigrants are not impoverished by the standards of their home countries. The poorest classes in a developing country may lack the resources needed to mount an attempt to cross illegally, or the connections to friends or family already in the destination country. Studies from the Pew Hispanic Center have shown that the education and wage levels of illegal Mexican immigrants in the US are around the median for Mexico and that they are not a suitable predictor of one's choice to immigrate.

Other examples do show that increases in poverty, especially when associated with immediate crises, can increase the likelihood of illegal migration. The 1994 economic crisis in Mexico, subsequent to the start of the North American Free Trade Agreement (NAFTA), was associated with widespread poverty and a lower valuation for the peso relative to the dollar. It also marked the start of a massive swell in Mexican immigration, in which net illegal migration to the US increased every year from the mid-1990s until the mid-2000s.

There are also examples where natural disasters and population growth can amplify poverty-driven migration flows.

Overpopulation

Population growth that exceeds the carrying capacity of an area or environment results in overpopulation.

Family reunification
Some illegal immigrants seek to live with loved ones who already live in a country that they are not allowed to enter, such as a spouse or other family members.

Having a family who have immigrated or being from a community with many immigrants is a much better predictor of one's choice to immigrate than poverty. Family reunification visas may be applied for by legal residents or naturalized citizens to bring their family members into a destination state legally, but these visas may be limited in number and subject to yearly quotas. This may result in family members entering illegally in order to reunify. From studying Mexican migration patterns, Douglas Massey finds that the likelihood that a Mexican national will emigrate illegally to the US increases dramatically if they have one or more family members already residing in the United States, legally or illegally.

Asylum

Unauthorised arrival into another country may be prompted by the need to escape civil war or repression in the country of origin. However, somebody who flees such a situation is in most countries under no circumstances an undocumented immigrant. If victims of forced displacement apply for asylum in the country they fled to and are granted refugee status they have the right to remain permanently. If asylum seekers are not granted some kind of legal protection status, then they may have to leave the country, or stay as illegal immigrants.

According to the 1951 Refugee Convention refugees should be exempted from immigration laws and should expect protection from the country they entered. It is, however, up to the countries involved to decide if a particular immigrant is a refugee or not, and hence whether they are subject to the immigration controls. Furthermore, countries that did not sign the 1951 Refugee Convention or do not attempt to follow its guidelines are likely to consider refugees and asylum seekers as illegal immigrants.

Deprivation of citizenship

In a 2012 news story, the CSM reported, "The estimated 750,000 Rohingya, one of the most miserable and oppressed minorities in the world, are deeply resentful of their almost complete absence of civil rights in Myanmar. In 1982, the military junta stripped the Rohingya of their Myanmar citizenship, classing them as illegal immigrants and rendering them stateless."

In some countries, people born on national territory (henceforth not "immigrants") do not automatically obtain the nationality of their birthplace, and may have no legal title of residency.

Education
Families want to have better lives for their children and to succeed. In the article "Learning to be illegal" it discusses the safety the children have in K-12 schooling. The children are guaranteed education in a safe environment.

Problems faced by illegal immigrants
Aside from the possibility that they may be intercepted and deported, illegal immigrants also face other problems.

Lack of access to services
Illegal immigrants usually have no or very limited access to public health systems, proper housing, education and banks. For instance, the current international human rights framework stipulates in various documents that the right to health and access to healthcare is fundamental and independent of a person's legal status. However, on a domestic level, many States in Europe have established the right to health as a welfare right, making it subject to citizenship or other administrative requirements. Whether it's due to the danger behind disclosing their status or because of the inherently unfair social infrastructures, these barriers are present in all types of services, from social security to health. Some immigrants may forge identity documents to have access to these services.

Slavery

For example, research at San Diego State University estimates that there are 2.4 million victims of human trafficking among illegal Mexican immigrants in the United States. Some workers are smuggled into the United States and Canada by human traffickers.

People have been kidnapped or tricked into slavery to work as laborers, after entering the country, for example in factories. Those trafficked in this manner often face additional barriers to escaping slavery, since their status as undocumented immigrants makes it difficult for them to gain access to help or services. For example, Burmese women trafficked into Thailand and forced to work in factories or as prostitutes may not speak the language and may be vulnerable to abuse by police due to their undocumented immigrant status.

Kidnapping and ransoms
In some regions, people that are still en route to their destination country are also sometimes kidnapped, for example for ransom. In some instances, they are also tortured, raped, and killed if the requested ransom does not arrive. One case in point are the Eritrean migrants that are en route to Israel. A large number of them are captured in north Sinai (Egypt) and Eastern Sudan and held in the buildings in north Sinai.

Sexual exploitation  

Since the fall of the Iron Curtain, Western Europe is being confronted with a serious problem related to the sexual exploitation of undocumented immigrants (especially from Eastern Europe), for the purpose of prostitution.

In the United States, human trafficking victims often pass through the porous border with Mexico. In an effort to curb the spread of sex slavery and other predation on unauthorized immigrants, California Attorney General Kamala Harris and Mexico Attorney General Marisela Morales Ibáñez signed an accord in 2012 to expand prosecutions of criminals typically members of transnational gangs who engage in the trafficking of human beings between the two countries.

Exploitation of labour

Most countries have laws requiring workers to have proper documentation, often intended to prevent or minimize the employment of undocumented immigrants. However the penalties against employers are often small and the acceptable identification requirements vague, ill-defined and seldom checked or enforced, making it easy for employers to hire illegal labor. Additionally, if an employer does not maintain proper safety standards, refuses to pay, or creates overall precarious working conditions,  looking for remedies or redress would also mean the risk of having to disclose their status. In other words, undocumented migrants are not protected by labour standards and regulations as people with a legal status are. Where the minimum wage is several times the prevailing wage in the home country, employers sometimes pay less than the legal minimum wage or have unsafe working conditions, relying on the reluctance of illegal workers to report the violations to the authorities. Undocumented employees' ability to work legally no longer exists, which makes it easier for corporations to take advantage of their services. Unfair and unjust, the exploitation of undocumented immigrants' labor goes unpunished because they are not considered legal immigrants.

Injury and illness 
The search for employment is central to illegal international migration. According to data from the U.S. Census Bureau, undocumented immigrants in the United States often work in dangerous industries such as agriculture and construction. A recent study suggests that the complex web of consequences resulting from illegal immigrant status limits illegal workers' ability to stay safe at work. In addition to physical danger at work, the choice to immigrate for work often entails work-induced lifestyle factors which impact the physical, mental and social health of immigrants and their families.

Death
Each year there are several hundred deaths along the U.S.–Mexico border of immigrants crossing the border illegally. Death by exposure occurs in the deserts of Southwestern United States during the hot summer season. In 2016 there were approximately 8,000 migrant deaths, with about 63% of deaths occurring within the Mediterranean.

Methods

Illegal border crossing

Immigrants from countries that do not have automatic visa agreements, or who would not otherwise qualify for a visa, often cross the borders illegally in some areas like the United States–Mexico border, the Mona Channel between the Dominican Republic and Puerto Rico, the Strait of Gibraltar, Fuerteventura, and the Strait of Otranto. Because these methods are illegal, they are often dangerous. Would-be immigrants have been known to suffocate in shipping containers, boxcars, and trucks, sink in shipwrecks caused by unseaworthy vessels, die of dehydration or exposure during long walks without water. An official estimate puts the number of people who died in illegal crossings across the U.S.–Mexican border between 1998 and 2004 at 1,954 (see immigrant deaths along the U.S.-Mexico border).

Human smuggling is the practice of intermediaries aiding undocumented immigrants in crossing over international borders in financial gain, often in large groups. Human smuggling differs from, but is sometimes associated with, human trafficking. A human smuggler will facilitate illegal entry into a country for a fee, but on arrival at their destination, the smuggled person is usually free. Trafficking involves a process of using physical force, fraud, or deception to obtain and transport people.

Types of notorious human smugglers include Snakehead gangs present in mainland China (especially in Fujian) that smuggle laborers into Pacific Rim states (making Chinatowns frequent centers of illegal immigration) and "coyotes", who smuggle undocumented immigrants to the Southwestern United States and have been known to abuse or even kill their passengers. Sometimes undocumented immigrants are abandoned by their human traffickers if there are difficulties, often dying in the process. Others may be victims of intentional killing.

Overstaying visa
Many undocumented immigrants are migrants who originally arrive in a country lawfully but overstay their authorized residence (overstaying a visa). For example, most of the estimated 200,000 illegal immigrants in Canada (perhaps as high as 500,000) are refugee claimants whose refugee applications were rejected but who have not yet been expelled from the country.

Another example is formed by children of foreigners born in countries observing jus soli ("right of territory"), such as was the case in France until 1994 and in Ireland until 2005. In these countries, it was possible to obtain French or Irish nationality (respectively) solely by being born in France before 1994 or in Ireland before 2005 (respectively). At present, a French born child of foreign parents does not automatically obtain French nationality until residency duration conditions are met. Since 1 January 2005, a child born in Ireland does not automatically acquire Irish nationality unless certain conditions are met.

Sham marriages
Some people enter into sham marriages, whereby marriage is contracted into for purely immigration advantage by a couple who are not in a genuine relationship. Common reasons for sham marriages are to gain immigration (i.e., immigration fraud), residency, work, or citizenship rights for one or both of the spouses, or for other benefits.

In the United Kingdom, those who arrange, participate in, or officiate over a sham marriage may be charged with a number of offenses, including assisting unlawful immigration and conspiracy to facilitate a breach of immigration law.

The United States has a penalty of a $250,000 fine and five-year prison sentence for such arrangements. The U.S. Immigration and Customs Enforcement (ICE) and the Justice Department say that they do not have accurate numbers on the rate of attempted marriage fraud. In the 2009 fiscal year, 506 (0.2%) of the 241,154 petitions filed were denied for suspected fraud; 7% were denied on other grounds.

Irregular immigrant populations by country or region

Africa

Angola

In 2007 around 44,000 Congolese were forced to leave Angola. Since 2004, more than 400,000 illegal immigrants, almost all from the Democratic Republic of the Congo, have been expelled from Angola.

South Africa

No accurate estimates of the number of illegal migrants living in South Africa exist. Estimates that have been published vary widely. A 1996 Human Sciences Research Council study estimated that there were between 2.5 million and 4.1 million illegal migrants in the country. In their 2008–09 annual report, the South African Police Service stated: "According to various estimates, the number of undocumented immigrants in South Africa may vary between three and six million people". Other estimates have put the figure as high as 10 million. , Statistics South Africa's official estimate is of between 500,000 and one million undocumented migrants. A large number of Zimbabweans have fled to South Africa as a result of instability in Zimbabwe, with many living as illegal migrants in South Africa. Sociologist Alice Bloch notes that migrants in South Africa have been the victims of xenophobia and violence, regardless of their immigration status.

South to East Asia

Bangladesh 
There are about 1.2 million Indians living in Bangladesh illegally as of 2014. The illegal migrants are mainly from the poorest states in India including West Bengal, Meghalaya, Assam and Manipur, which surround Bangladesh. They illegally immigrate to Bangladesh in search of jobs in the metropolitan hubs and a better standard of living. Bangladesh is fifth among the nations sending highest remittances to India. Indians working in Bangladesh sent more than $3.7 billion back to India in 2012.

There is a significant number of Burmese illegal immigrants in Bangladesh. As of 2012, the Bangladesh government estimated about 500,000 illegal Burmese immigrants living across Bangladesh.

Bhutan

Immigration in Bhutan by Nepalese settlers (Lhotshampa) began slowly towards the end of the 19th century. The government passed the Bhutanese Citizenship Act 1985 to clarify and try to enforce the Bhutanese Citizenship Act 1958 to control the flood of illegal immigration. Those individuals who could not provide proof of residency prior to 1958 were adjudged to be undocumented immigrants. In 1991 and 1992, Bhutan expelled roughly 139,110 ethnic Nepalis, most of whom have been living in seven refugee camps in eastern Nepal ever since. The United States has offered to resettle 60,000 of the 107,000 Bhutanese refugees of Nepalese origin now living in U.N. refugee camps in Nepal. The Bhutanese government, even today, has not been able to sort the problem of giving citizenship to those people who are married to Bhutanese, even though they have been in the country for 40 years.

India

It is estimated that several tens of millions of illegal immigrants live in India. Precise figures are not available, but the numbers run in tens of millions, at least 10 million are from Bangladesh, others being from Pakistan, Afghanistan and others. According to the Government of India, there at least 20 million illegal immigrants from Bangladesh alone. This makes India the country with the largest number of illegal immigrants in the world. During the Bangladesh Liberation War at least 10 million Bangladeshis crossed into India illegally to seek refuge from widespread rape and genocide. According to Indian Home Ministry, at least 1.4 Million Bangladeshi crossed over into India in the last decade alone. Samir Guha Roy of the Indian Statistical Institute states that internal migration is sometimes falsely thought to be immigrants. An analysis of the numbers by Roy revealed that on average around 91000 Bangladeshi nationals might have crossed over to India every year during the years 1981–1991, thus, close to a million in a decade alone. How many of them were identified and pushed back is not known. It is possible that some of these illegal immigrants returned on their own.

According to a pro-Indian scholar, the trip to India from Bangladesh is one of the cheapest in the world, with a trip costing around Rs. 2000 (around $30 US), which includes the fee for the "Tour Operator". As Bangladeshis are cultural similar to the Bengali people in India, they are able to pass off as Indian citizens and settle down in any part of India to establish a future., for a very small price. This false identity can be bolstered with false documentation available for as little as Rs. 200 ($3 US) can even make them part of the vote bank.

India is constructing barriers on its eastern borders to combat the surge of migrants. The Indo-Bangladeshi barrier is 4,000 km (2,500 mi) long. Presently, India is constructing a fence along the border to restrict illegal traffic from Bangladesh. This obstruction will virtually isolate Bangladesh from India. The barrier's plan is based on the designs of the Israeli West Bank barrier and will be 3.6 m (11.8 ft) high. The stated aim of the fence is to stop infiltration of terrorists, prevent smuggling, and end illegal immigration from Bangladesh.

Malaysia

There are an estimated 800,000 illegal immigrants in Malaysia. In January 2009, Malaysia banned the hiring of foreign workers in factories, stores and restaurants to protect its citizens from mass unemployment amid the late 2000s recession. An ethnic Indian Malaysian was recently sentenced to whipping and 10 months in prison for hiring six illegal immigrants at his restaurant. "I think that after this, Malaysian employers will be afraid to take in foreign workers (without work permits). They will think twice", said immigration department prosecutor Azlan Abdul Latiff. "This is the first case where an employer is being sentenced to caning", he said. Illegal immigrants also face caning before being deported.

Pakistan

As of 2005, 2.1% of the population of Pakistan had foreign origins, however the number of immigrants population in Pakistan recently grew sharply. Immigrants from South Asia make up a growing proportion of immigrants in Pakistan. The five largest immigrant groups in Pakistan are in turn Afghans, Bangladeshi, Tajiks, Uzbeks, Turkmens, Iranians, Indians, Sri Lankan, Burmese and Britons including a sizeable number of those of Pakistani origin. Other significant expatriate communities in the country are Armenians, Australians, Turks, Chinese, Americans, Filipinos, Bosnians and many others. Migrants from different countries of Arab world specially Egypt, Iraq, Palestine, Syria, Kuwait, Libya, Saudi Arabia, and Yemen are in thousands. Nearly all illegal migrants in Pakistan are Muslim refugees and they are accepted by the local population. There is no political support or legislation to deport these refugees from Pakistan.

Philippines
It was estimated by Teresita Ang-See, a prominent leader and activist of the Chinese Filipino community, that by 2007, as much as 100,000 illegal immigrants from mainland China are living in the Philippines, a tenth of the ethnic Chinese population. The latest influx has come in part because of Manila's move in 2005 to liberalise entry procedures for Chinese tourists and investors, a move that helped triple the number of Chinese visitors to 133,000 last year. Many of the new Chinese immigrants encounter hostility from many Filipinos, including Filipino-born Chinese, for being perceived as engaging in criminal activities and fraud.

South Korea 
According to the Republic of Korea Immigration Service, as of 31 December 2014, there were 208,778 illegal immigrants, which is 11.6% of 1,797,618 total foreign nationals who resided in South Korea. Most illegal immigrants in South Korea are Asian. The top 10 home countries of those illegal immigrants all came from other Asian countries with China at number 1 followed by Thailand, Vietnam, Philippines, Mongolia, Indonesia, Uzbekistan, Bangladesh, Sri Lanka and Cambodia.

Other countries
 China: (see Illegal immigration in China.) China is building a security barrier along its border with North Korea to prevent the defectors or refugees from North Korea. Also, many illegal immigrants from Mongolia have tried to make it to China. There might be as many as 100,000 Africans in Guangzhou, mostly illegal overstayers. To encourage people to report foreigners living illegally in China, for instance in 2010 during Guangzhou Asian Games, the police gave 100 yuan reward to whistle blowers whose information successfully led to a deportation.
 Nepal: In 2008, Nepal's Maoist-led government has initiated a major crackdown against Tibetan exiles with the aim to deport to China all Tibetans living illegally in the country. Tibetans started pouring into Nepal after a failed anti-Chinese uprising in Tibet in 1959.
 Thailand: (see Illegal immigration to Thailand.)

Americas

Brazil

Brazil has long been part of international migration routes. In 2009, the government estimated the number of illegal immigrants at about 200,000 people; a Catholic charity working with immigrants said there were 600,000 illegal immigrants (75,000 of whom were from Bolivia). That same year, the National Congress of Brazil approved an amnesty, opening a six-month window for all foreigners to seek legalization irrespective of their previous standing before the law. Brazil had last legalized all immigrants in 1998; bilateral deals, one of which promoted the legalization of all reciprocal immigrants with Bolivia to date, signed in 2005, are also common.

Illegal immigrants in Brazil enjoy the same legal privileges as native Brazilians regarding access to social services such as public education and the Brazilian public healthcare system. A Federal Police operation investigated Chinese immigrants who traveled through six countries before arriving in São Paulo to work under substandard conditions in the textile industry.

After signing the 2009 amnesty bill into law, President Lula da Silva said, in a speech, that "repression and intolerance against immigrants will not solve the problems caused by" the financial crisis of 2007–2008, thereby also harshly criticizing the "policy of discrimination and prejudice" against immigrants in developed nations.

An October 2009 piece from O Globo, quoting a UNDP study, estimates the number of illegal immigrants at 0.7 million, and points out to a recent wave of xenophobia among the general populace.

Canada

There is no credible information available on illegal immigration in Canada. Estimates range between 35,000 and 120,000 illegal immigrants in Canada. James Bissett, a former head of the Canadian Immigration Service, has suggested that the lack of any credible refugee screening process, combined with a high likelihood of ignoring any deportation orders, has resulted in tens of thousands of outstanding warrants for the arrest of rejected refugee claimants, with little attempt at enforcement. Refugee claimants in Canada do not have to attempt re-entry to learn the status of their claim. A 2008 report by the Auditor General Sheila Fraser stated that Canada has lost track of as many as 41,000 illegal immigrants. This number was predicted to increase drastically with the expiration of temporary employer work permits issued in 2007 and 2008, which were not renewed in many cases because of the shortage of work due to the recession.

Mexico

In the first six months of 2005, more than 120,000 people from Central America were deported, as compared to 2002, when for the entire year, only 130,000 were deported. People of Han Chinese origin pay about $5,500 to smugglers to be taken to Mexico from Hong Kong. It is estimated that 2.4% of rejections for work permits in Mexico correspond to Chinese citizens. In a 2010 news story, USA Today reported, "... Mexico's Arizona-style law requires local police to check IDs. And Mexican police freely engage in racial profiling and routinely harass Central American migrants, say immigration activists."

Many women from Eastern Europe, Asia, and Central and South America take jobs at table dance establishments in large cities. The National Institute of Migration (INM) in Mexico raids strip clubs and deports foreigners who work without proper documentation. In 2004, the INM deported 188,000 people at a cost of US$10 million.

In September 2007, Mexican President Calderón harshly criticized the United States government for the crackdown on illegal immigrants, saying it has led to the persecution of immigrant workers without visas. "I have said that Mexico does not stop at its border, that wherever there is a Mexican, there is Mexico", he said. However, Mexico has also deported US citizens, deporting 2,000 cases in 2015 and 1,243 in 2014.

Illegal immigration of Cubans through Cancún tripled from 2004 to 2006. In October 2008, Mexico tightened its immigration rules and agreed to deport Cubans who use the country as an entry point to the US. It also criticized US policy that generally allows Cubans who reach US territory to stay. Cuban Foreign Minister said the Cuban-Mexican agreement would lead to "the immense majority of Cubans being repatriated."

United States

Approximately 11 million illegal immigrants were estimated to be living in the United States in 2006. The Pew Hispanic Center estimated that this peaked at 12 million in March 2007 and declined to 11 million again in March 2009. The majority of the illegal immigrants are from Mexico.

The issue of illegal immigration has long been controversial in the United States. In 2007, President George W. Bush called for Congress to endorse his guest worker proposal, stating that illegal immigrants took jobs that Americans would not take.

The Pew Hispanic Center notes that while the number of legal immigrants arriving has not varied substantially since the 1980s, the number of illegal immigrants has increased dramatically and, since the mid-1990s, has surpassed the number of legal immigrants. Penalties for employers of illegal immigrants, of $2,000–$10,000 and up to six months' imprisonment, go largely unenforced.

Political groups like Americans for Legal Immigration have formed to demand enforcement of immigration laws and secure borders. ALIPAC has also called for "safe departure" border checkpoints, free of criminal checks.

In a 2011 news story, the Los Angeles Times reported, ...illegal immigrants in 2010 were parents of 5.5 million children, 4.5 million of whom were born in the U.S. and are citizens. Because illegal immigrants are younger and more likely to be married, they represented a disproportionate share of births—8% of the babies born in the U.S. between March 2009 and March 2010 were to at least one illegal immigrant parent.

Immigration from Mexico to the United States has slowed in recent years. This has been attributed to the slowing of the U.S. economy, the buildup in security along the border and increased violence on the Mexican side of the Mexico–United States border.

In 2016, the Library of Congress announced it would substitute "noncitizens" and "unauthorized immigration" for "illegal aliens" as a bibliographic retrieval term, saying the once common phrase had become offensive, and was not precise. However, the change was suspended and the heading "illegal aliens" remains in use.

In 2018, Attorney General Jeff Sessions instructed the US attorneys offices not to use the term "undocumented immigrants", but to instead refer to people as "illegal aliens".

Other countries
 Venezuela: An estimated 200,000 Colombians fled the Colombian conflict and sought safety in Venezuela. Most of them lacked identity documents, which hampered their access to services, as well as to the labor market. The Venezuelan government has no specific policies on refugees. A much greater number of Venezuelans entered Colombia trying to escape from the political, economic and humanitarian crisis in the 21st century, especially during the last five to 10 years.
 Chile: Chile has recently become a new pole of attraction for illegal immigrants, mostly from neighboring Peru and Bolivia but also Ecuador, Colombia, Dominican Republic, Paraguay, Venezuela and Haiti. According to the 2002 national census, Chile's foreign-born foreign population has increased by 75% since 1992.
 Dominican Republic: The Dominican Republic is a nation that shares the island of Hispaniola with Haiti. An estimated 1,000,000 Haitians live and work in the Dominican Republic, which has a total population of about ten million. The percentage of Haitians that have illegally immigrated to the Dominican Republic is not accurately known, and "many Dominicans have come to resent the influx of lower-paid workers from across the border and have sought to make their country less hospitable to noncitizens." (See also Haitians in the Dominican Republic.)

Eurasia and Oceania

Australia

Official government sources put the number of visa overstayers in Australia at approximately 50,000. This has been the official number of illegal immigrants for about 25 years and is considered to be low. Other sources have placed it at up to 100,000, but no detailed study has been completed to quantify this number, which could be significantly higher.

On 1 June 2013, the Migration Amendment (Reform of Employer Sanctions) Act 2013 commenced. This new law puts the onus on businesses to ensure that their employees maintain the necessary work entitlements in Australia. The new legislation also enables the Australian Department of Immigration and Citizenship to levy infringement notices against business (AUD $15,300) and individual (AUD $3,060) employers on a strict liability basis – meaning that there is no requirement to prove fault, negligence or intention.

Russia

Russia experiences a constant flow of immigration. On average, 200,000 legal immigrants enter the country every year; about half are ethnic Russians from other republics of the former Soviet Union. There are an estimated 10–12 million foreigners working in the country without legal permission to be there. There has been a significant influx of ethnic Georgians, Armenians, Azerbaijanis, Tajiks, and Uzbeks into large Russian cities in recent years, which has been viewed very unfavorably by many citizens and contributed to nationalist sentiments.

Many immigrant ethnic groups have much higher birth rates than native Russians, further shifting the balance. Some Chinese flee the overpopulation and birth control regulations of their home country and settle in the Far East and in southern Siberia. Russia's main Pacific port and naval base of Vladivostok, once closed to foreigners, today is bristling with Chinese markets, restaurants and trade houses. This has been occurring a lot since the Soviet collapse.

Illegal border crossing is considered a crime, and captured illegal border crossers have been sentenced to prison terms. For example, Rossiyskaya Gazeta reported in October 2008 the case of a North Korean who was detained after illegally crossing the Amur River from China. Considered by Russian authorities an "economic migrant", he was sentenced to 6 months in prison and was to be deported to the country of his nationality after serving his sentence, even though he may now risk an even heavier penalty there. That was just one of the 26 cases year-to-date of illegal entrants, of various nationalities, receiving criminal punishment in Amur Oblast.

Turkey

Turkey receives many economic migrants from nearby countries such as Azerbaijan, Georgia, Armenia, but also from North Caucasus, Central Asia, West Asia, Afghanistan and Pakistan. The Iraq War is thought to have increased the flow of illegal immigration into Turkey, and the global parties directly involved in the conflict have been accused of extending a less-helping hand than Turkey itself to resolve the precarious situation of immigrants stranded in passage.

Europe 

The Schengen Area is a multilateral agreement between 27 states in which they in most cases abolish the border control among themselves. These states include most of the EU countries, as well as the EEC countries Norway, Switzerland and Iceland. Any person who is physically inside any of the Schengen states will usually be able to travel to any other Schengen state without hindrance from the law enforcement, even if he or she has no legal right to enter another Schengen Area member state. A person who wishes to immigrate illegally to a Schengen Area member state may therefore find it more practical to enter it through another member state. According to a BBC report from 2012, over 80% of illegal immigrants entering the European Union pass through Greece.

EU countries that are not members of the Schengen Agreement are still committed to allow lawful entry by citizens of EU countries; they may however exercise border control at their discretion. This typically presents a significant hindrance to persons who are trying to enter those countries illegally.

Citizens within The EU is an economic and political partnership between 28 European countries that together cover much of the European continent. A citizen of an EU member state has the right to seek employment within any other member state. The Schengen Agreement does not regulate treatment of persons who enter the Schengen Area illegally. This is therefore left to the individual states, and other applicable international treaties and European case law. Illegal immigration to Schengen and to Europe in general was increasing sharply since approximately early 2014. The main causes for this increase are the conflicts that followed the Arab Spring; in particular, the civil war in Syria has driven millions of people from their homes, and the disintegration of the Libyan government removed a major barrier for the African migrants.

Illegal immigration to some of the Schengen Area states might face different consideration depending on countries such as Bulgaria, France, Greece.

France

Children born to noncitizens in France are not immigrants themselves, but they are considered foreigners under French law, until they reach the age of 18, at which time they automatically become citizens. French citizenship is based in the idea of political unity; therefore, French citizenship may be more accessible than other EU countries, such as Germany and the UK. However, many French citizens feel that those who gain French citizenship should conform to the cultural aspects of French life. Foreigners can also become French citizens if they serve in the Foreign Legion.

French law prohibits anyone from assisting or trying to assist "the entry of a foreigner in France." (Except for a non-EU national, entering in metropolitan France illegally from the territory of a Schengen country)

Hungary

In 2014, Hungary registered 43,000 asylum seekers and 80,000 up to July 2015. In the summer of 2015, Hungary started building a 4m high fence along its 175 km border to neighbouring Serbia to keep out the tens of thousands illegal immigrants from the Middle East and migrants trying to reach the European Union. The border was sealed on 15 September 2015 and the fence was the following day attacked by refugees and defended by riot police.

With the Hungary-Serbia border closed, migrants then started heading to Croatia, but as Croatia led the migrants to the Hungary-Croatia border, Hungary then started the construction of a second fence along its border with Croatia on 18 September 2015.

United Kingdom

Many try to cross the English Channel from Calais to seek asylum or refugee status in Great Britain. Truck drivers can be fined up to €2,500 if illegal immigrants are found on board. The Home Office has its agents working alongside French police and immigration agents, to prevent unauthorized people from entering the zone. An area of Calais known as "the Jungle" had a police raid in September 2009 to control illegal immigration. The French also try to stop illegal immigrants from entering France from the southern part of the country.

Non-governmental organizations, such as Secours Catholique and the Red Cross provide food, showers, and shelter to sans papiers who gather waiting to cross the Channel.

In 1986, an Iranian man was sent back to Paris, from London, as he was unable to present any ID to British immigration officers. He stayed at the airport for nearly twenty years and his story loosely inspired a film, The Terminal.

 there were between 550,000 and 950,000 illegal immigrants in the United Kingdom. The United Kingdom is a difficult country to reach as it is mostly located on one island and part of another, but traffickers in Calais, France have tried to smuggle illegal immigrants into the UK. Many illegal immigrants come from Africa and Asia. As of 2008 there were also many from Eastern Europe and Latin America having overstayed their visas.

A 2012 study carried out by the University of Oxford's Centre on Migration, Policy and Society (COMPAS) has estimated that there were 120,000 illegal migrant children in the UK, of whom 65,000 were born in the UK to parents without legal status. According to the study these children are at risk of destitution, exploitation and social exclusion because of contradictory and frequently changing rules and regulations which jeopardize their access to healthcare, education, protection by the police and other public services.

The Home Office estimated that 4,000 to 10,000 applications a year to stay in the UK are made on the basis of a sham marriage. Many undocumented immigrants or asylum seekers have tried to enter the UK from France, by hiding inside trucks or trains.

On 11 August 2020, the Government of Britain and France worked together on a single channel to finalize a new plan for blocking illegal migrant route. Many of the migrants who aimed to emigrate to Britain came from Afghanistan, Iraq, Iran, Syria and countries in Africa, fleeing poverty, persecution or war.

Other countries 
 Bulgaria: In 2013, 11,000 persons attempted to enter Bulgaria via its border with Turkey. Their aim is not believed by Bulgarian border officials to remain in Bulgaria, but to go to other European countries. In November 2013, Bulgaria started building a razor wire fence on its Turkey border, which was completed in 2015.
 Norway: The number of illegal immigrants in Norway was estimated to roughly 20 thousand in 2009, and to between 18 and 56 thousand in 2017. Estimates by organizations working with illegal migrants are much lower, between 5 thousand and 10 thousand in 2011.
 Germany: The number of irregular immigrants caught in Germany from January to November 2018 was 38,000 according to the Federal Police. Over 28,000 people entered Germany by land and 10,300 entering from Austria. Some 9,270 people also arrived illegally at airports and more than 1,120 people at sea ports. Most of the migrants were from Afghanistan, Nigeria, Iraq, Syria and Turkey.
 Switzerland: It is estimated that at least 100,000 individuals reside in Switzerland without being registered with the authorities and thus are considered illegal immigrants by the state. Many are also workers, employed as nannies, labourers on farms or construction sites, as well as waiters or kitchen or other ancillary staff in the restaurant and hotel industry.

Middle East

Iran

Since late April 2007, the Iranian government has forcibly deported back Afghans living and working in Iran to Afghanistan at a rate between 250,000 and 300,000 per year. The forceful evictions of the refugees, who lived in Iran and Pakistan for nearly three decades, are part of the two countries' larger plans to repatriate all Afghan refugees within a few years. Iran said that it would send 1,000,000 by March 2008, and Pakistan announced that all 2,400,000 Afghan refugees, most living in camps, must return home by 2009. Aimal Khan, a political analyst at the Sustainable Development Policy Institute in Islamabad said it would be "disastrous" for Afghanistan.

Israel

Tens of thousands of migrants, mostly from Sudan and Eritrea, had crossed the Israeli border between 2009 and 2012. Prime Minister Benjamin Netanyahu said that "This phenomenon is very grave and threatens the social fabric of society, our national security and our national identity." In May 2012, Israel introduced a law which would allow illegal immigrants to be detained for up to three years, a measure that the Interior Ministry intended to stem the flow of Africans entering Israel across the desert border with Egypt. As a result, completing a barrier along the border with Egypt, illegal immigration from Africa decreased by over 99%.

Israel faces substantial (estimated at 40,000 in 2009) illegal immigration of Arab workers from the Palestinian Authority territories, a migration that includes both workers seeking employment, and homosexuals escaping the social opprobrium of Arab society.

Thousands of foreign workers who entered the country on temporary visas have overstayed and live illegally in Israel. There is a debate within Israel as to whether the Israel-born children of foreign workers should be allowed to remain in the country.

Libya

Before the Libyan civil war, Libya was home to a large population of illegal immigrants from Sub-Saharan Africa, numbering as much as 2,000,000. The mass expulsion plan to summarily deport all illegally residing foreigners was announced by then-current Libyan leader Colonel Muammar al-Gaddafi in January 2008, "No resident without a legal visa will be excluded."

Saudi Arabia

In 2004, Saudi Arabia began construction of a Saudi–Yemen barrier between its territory and Yemen to prevent the unauthorized movement of people and goods into and out of the Kingdom. Anthony H. Cordesman labeled it a "separation barrier". In February 2004, The Guardian reported that Yemeni opposition newspapers likened the barrier to the Israeli West Bank barrier, while The Independent wrote "Saudi Arabia, one of the most vocal critics in the Arab world of Israel's 'security fence' in the West Bank, is quietly emulating the Israeli example by erecting a barrier along its porous border with Yemen". Saudi officials rejected the comparison saying it was built to prevent infiltration and smuggling.

Syria
Since the US-led invasion of Iraq in March 2003, there are more refugees from Iraq. The United Nations estimates that nearly 2,200,000 Iraqis have fled the country since 2003, with nearly 100,000 fleeing to Syria and Jordan each month. Most ventured to Jordan and Syria, creating demographic shifts that have worried both governments. Refugees are mired in poverty as they are generally barred from working in their host countries.

Syrian authorities worried that the new influx of refugees would limit the country's resources. Sources like oil, heat, water and electricity were said to be becoming scarcer as demand were rising. On 1 October 2007, news agencies reported that Syria reimposed restrictions on Iraqi refugees, as stated by a spokesperson for the United Nations High Commissioner for Refugees. Under Syria's new rules, only Iraqi merchants, businessmen and university professors with visas acquired from Syrian embassies may enter Syria.

See also

 Asylum shopping
 Bolivarian diaspora
 Border control
 Deportation
 Environmental migration
 Free migration
 Immigration and crime
 Immigration and Customs Enforcement
 International Convention on the Protection of the Rights of All Migrant Workers and Members of Their Families
 Nationality law
 Open border
 Political demography
 Stowaway
 Undocumented youth in the United States
 Unreported employment (Working under the table)
 Venezuelan diaspora

References

Further reading

 Barkan, Elliott R. 2003. "Return of the Nativists? California Public Opinion and Immigration in the 1980s and 1990s." Social Science History 27(2):229–83. online
 Beasley, Vanessa B., ed. 2006. Who Belongs in America?: Presidents, Rhetoric, And Immigration.
 Besenyo, Janos. 2017. "Fences and Border Protection: The Question of Establishing Technical Barriers in Europe." AARMS 16(1):77–87.
 Bischoff, Christine, Francesca Falk, and Sylvia Kafehsy. 2010 November. "Images of Illegalized Immigration. Towards a Critical Iconology of Politics." Bielefeld: transcript. 
 Borjas, G.J. 1994. "The economics of immigration." Journal of Economic Literature (32):1667–717.
 Chacón, Jennifer M. "Criminal Law & Migration Control: Recent History & Future Possibilities". Daedalus 151#1 (2022), pp. 121–34. online
 De La Torre, Miguel A. 2009. "Trails of Terror: Testimonies on the Current Immigration Debate." Orbis Books.
 Dowling, Julie A., and Jonathan Xavier Inda, eds. 2013. "Governing Immigration Through Crime: A Reader  ." Stanford, CA: Stanford University Press.
 Espenshade, Thomas J. 1995. "Unauthorized Immigration to the United States" Annual Review of Sociology (21):195+.
 
 Hopkins, Daniel J. "National Debates, Local Responses: The Origins of Local Concern about Immigration in Britain and the United States". British Journal of Political Science 41#3 (2011), pp. 499–524. online
 Hunter, W. 2019. Undocumented Nationals: Between Statelessness and Citizenship. Cambridge: Cambridge University Press.
 Inda, Jonathan Xavier. 2006. "Targeting Immigrant: Government, Technology, and Ethics." Malden, MA: Wiley-Blackwell.
 Kamphoefner, Walter D. "What’s New About the New Immigration? A Historian’s Perspective over Two Centuries." Studia Migracyjne-Przegląd Polonijny 45.3 (173) (2019). online focus on illegal migration to USA
 Kennedy, Marie, and Chris Tilly. 2008. 'They Work Here, They Live Here, They Stay Here!': French immigrants strike for the right to work—and win. Dollars & Sense (July/August 2008).
 Magaña, Lisa. 2003. Straddling the Border: Immigration Policy and the INS .
 Marquardt, Marie Friedmann, Timothy Steigenga, Philip Williams, and Manuel Vasquez. 2011. Living "Illegal": The Human Face of Unauthorized Immigration , The New Press.
 Mohl, Raymond A. 2002. "Latinization in the Heart of Dixie: Hispanics in Late-twentieth-century Alabama" Alabama Review 55(4):243–74.  9–4894945651.
 Myers, Dowell. 2007. Immigrants and Boomers: Forging a New Social Contract for the Future of America. Russell Sage Foundation, .
 Ngai, Mae M. 2003. "The Strange Career of the Illegal Alien: Immigration Restriction and Deportation Policy in the United States, 1921–1965." Law and History Review 21(1):69–107.  . Full text in History Cooperative.
 ——2004. Impossible Subjects: Illegal Aliens and the Making of Modern America.
 Range, Peter R. 1993 May. "Europe faces an immigrant tide." National Geographic Magazine .
 Rosello, Mireille. 1998. "Representing undocumented immigrants in France: From Clandestins to L'affaire Des Sans-Papiers De Saint-Bernard." Journal of European Studies 28: 959525126.
 
 Tranaes, T., and K. F. Zimmermann, eds. 2004. Migrants, Work, and the Welfare State , Odense, University Press of Southern Denmark.
 Venturini, A. 2004. Post-War Migration in Southern Europe. An Economic Approach Cambridge University Press.
 Vicino, Thomas J. 2013. Suburban Crossroads: The Fight for Local Control of Immigration Policy . Lanham, MD: Lexington Books.
 Zimmermann, K. F., ed. 2005. European Migration: What Do We Know? Oxford University Press.

 
Immigration
Human migration
Criminal law
Immigration
Morality